This is a list of supermarket chains in France

List of current French supermarket chains

See also

 For supermarkets worldwide see List of supermarkets

References

Supermarkets
Supermarkets
France